Carles Juanmartí Santiago (born December 20, 1978 in La Seu d'Urgell) is a Spanish slalom canoeist who has competed since the mid-1990s. He won two bronze medals at the 2009 ICF Canoe Slalom World Championships in La Seu d'Urgell, earning them in the K-1 and K-1 team events.

Juanmartí also competed in two Summer Olympics, earning his best finish of 11th in the K-1 event in Athens in 2004.

References
 12 September 2009 final results for the men's K-1 team event at the 2009 ICF Canoe Slalom World Championships. - accessed 12 September 2009.
 13 September 2009 final results of the men's K-1 event at the 2009 ICF Canoe Slalom World Championships. - accessed 13 September 2009.
 Athens 2004 Yahoo! profile
 Sports-Reference.com profile

1978 births
Canoeists at the 2000 Summer Olympics
Canoeists at the 2004 Summer Olympics
Sportspeople from the Province of Lleida
Living people
Olympic canoeists of Spain
Spanish male canoeists
Medalists at the ICF Canoe Slalom World Championships
People from Alt Urgell
21st-century Spanish people